The Kalu or The Kanu is both a surname and a given name for male child in Igbo or Ibo land located in the eastern part of Nigeria. Among the Igbo people it refers to the traditional Igbo god of thunder and lightning, Kamanu or Kamalu, which was then shortened to Kanu. In the Newar community of Nepal this term is used as the surname for the tribal caste under "Shrestha" Community.

 Ikechukwu Kalu, Nigerian footballer
 Kalu Idika Kalu, Nigerian politician and former minister of finance
 Joshua Kalu, Nigerian-American football player
 Maxwell Kalu, Nigerian footballer
 Orji Uzor Kalu, Nigerian politician serving prison term since December 2019 Till now
 Kalu Rinpoche (1905–1989), Tibetan Buddhist 
 Nnamdi Kanu the leader of the indigenous people of Biafra
  Kanu Ogbonnaya, Nigerian Biker

See also

Kallu (name)